Modern Literal Taiwanese (MLT), also known as Modern Taiwanese Language (MTL), is an orthography in the Latin alphabet for Taiwanese based on the Taiwanese Modern Spelling System (TMSS). MLT is able to use the ASCII character set to indicate the proper variation of pitch without any subsidiary scripts or diacritic symbols.

Phonology

MLT Examples

Universal Declaration of Human Rights

MLT greetings

The current system
The MLT alphabet adopts the Latin alphabet of 26 letters and the Scandinavian letter ø to express the basic sounds of Taiwanese:

a b c ch e f g h i j k kh l m n ng ø o p ph q r s t th u v y z zh

A MLT word, like each English word, can be formed by only one syllable or several syllables, with the two syllables being the most typical.  Each syllable in MLT follows either one of the two underlying patterns (phonemes inside the bracket [] are optional):

[Consonant] + [front nasal-sound] + vowel + [tone indicator]
[Consonant] + vowel + [tone indicator] + [rear nasal-sound]

Consonants
 Bilabial: b, p, ph, m
 Alveolar: t, th, n, l
 Velar: g, k, kh, h
 Palatal: c, ch, s, j
 Dental: z, zh, s, j

Vowels
 Simple: a, i, u, e, o, ø, m, ng
 Compound: ai, au, ia, iu, iø, iau, ui, oa, oe, øe, oai
 Special High Tone (1st tone of i, u): y, w
 Special Shouting-Out Tone (2nd tone of ai, i, u, e, au): ae, uo, ea, ao
 Front Nasal (indicator only, must be followed by a vowel): v
 Rear Nasal: m, n, ng

The nasals m, n, and ng can be appended to any of the vowels and some of the diphthongs.
In addition, m and ng can function as independent syllables by themselves.

The stops h/q, k/g, p/b and t/d can appear as the last letter in a syllable, in which case they are pronounced with no audible release.  (The finals h and q stand for a glottal stop of high and low tone, respectively.)

TMSS originally prescribed two special characters: the Greek letter ν and an o crossed by a backslash. These were replaced with the Latin letter v and number 0, respectively. Because mixing numbers into words is problematic for spell checkers, 0 was subsequently replaced by ø.

Tones
Not only consonants and vowel sounds, but also tones are represented by letters in the MLT system.  Certain letters have no sound of their own and are merely used as tone indicators.  Others letters represent vowels or vowel combinations which have certain tones.
For example, "f", "r", and "x" are tone indicators only, and have no sound of their own in MLT.  "Af" represents the "a" sound with a "high" tone, "ar" represents the same vowel sound but with a "shouting" tone, "ax" is the "a" sound with the low falling tone.  A "y" or "w" indicates a high tone "i" and "u", respectively, while certain diphthongs, such as "ie" and "uo", are treated as "shouting" tones.  The basic tone is represented by a normal, simple vowel (or voiced consonant—e.g. the nasals, "m" or "ng") without any special spelling modification.

High Tone
A high tone is derived by raising the pitch of the voice to a level somewhat above the basic tone and is normally represented by adding the tone indicator "f" after a vowel, with the exception of the “i” and “u” sounds in a syllable. A high tone "i" and a high tone "u" are denoted by "y" and "w", respectively.

(The high tone would be near the top of one's normal speaking register.  It may possibly be compared to the sort of high intonation used by English speakers when imitating a singer warming up with a high but level "mi, mi, mi, mi, mi".)

Shouting-out Tone
A shouting-out [or just "shouting"] tone is derived from shouting out a basic tone, and is normally represented by adding a tone indicator "r" after a vowel. When compound vowels are present in the shouting tone, however, sounds which by the normal rule would otherwise be written (“air”, “ir”, “ur”, “er”, and “aur”) are instead spelled "ae", "ie", "uo", "ea", and "ao", respectively. Exceptions occur when this rule overlaps with other rules. For example, the shouting tone of "lin" is written "lirn", not "lien" (interpreted as a compound vowel in basic tone) even though "lie" is the "shouting" counterpart to "li".

(Note that the so-called "shouting" tone is not literally a shout, but refers to the sort of quick, falling tone used, e.g., in shouting out a single-syllable word.  It may be understood by English speakers by comparing the neutral tone in the normal pronunciation of the vowel in the name "Bob" with the quick, falling tone used when shouting the name (or saying the name quietly but with urgency), "Bob!"  Similarly, saying "No!" achieves the same quick, downward tone in English.)

Low-falling tone
The low-falling tone is always marked by appending an "x" to the rearmost vowel.  (Think of the low, almost guttural tone used in  muttering a flat "Huh." or "Hmph." in English.)

Rising tone
The rising tone is denoted according to the following rules:
 Simple vowel: simply repeat the vowel. (E.g., "guu".)
 Compound vowel: repeat the last vowel letter except when it contains an “a”, then just repeat the “a”. (E.g., "zoaa".) In the case of ø, use øo rather than øø.

(Just as an urgent, quick "No!" can provide an example of the "shouting" tone in English, a questioning "No?" may represent the rising tone.)

Short tone
The low stopping tones are indicated by switching the final stops with the high stopping tones' as follows: h->q, t->d, p->b, k->g.

Examples
Examples for the seven tones:
 1 (High): ty (豬, pig)
 2 (Shouting-out): bea (馬, horse)
 3 (Low-falling): pax (豹, leopard)
 4 (Low stop): aq (鴨, duck)
 5 (Rising): zoaa (蛇, snake)
 7 (Basic): chviu (象, elephant)
 8 (High stop): lok (鹿, deer)

Special Symbols
The apostrophe (', typewriter apostrophe) is used to demarcate syllables when there is ambiguity. A hyphen (-) is used to join two or more isolated words to make a new compound word with its own meaning. When a word contains a grave accent (`), all the syllables after this mark are accented in the low tone (low-falling for the long tones, and low-short for short tones).

Comparison chart

History of MLT
The Pe̍h-ōe-jī (POJ) system, introduced in the 19th century, provides a basis for phonetic transcription of the Taiwanese language using the Latin alphabet.  It initially developed a significant user base, but the number of users declined during the period of Japanese colonization of Taiwan, when the use of POJ was suppressed in preference to katakana, and also during the era of martial law, during which Mandarin Chinese was promoted.

Prof. Liim Keahioong, formerly of the National Cheng Kung University in Tainan, Taiwan, pioneered the Taiwanese Modern Spelling System (TMSS) in 1943, with the intent to avoid the diacritical markings of POJ as well as the cumbersome difficulty of inputting Chinese characters with the available technology.  TMSS served as the basis for Modern Literal Taiwanese (MLT), also known as Modern Taiwanese Language (MTL).
Other variants of MLT exist, such as Phofsit Daibuun and Simplified MLT (SMLT).

Notes and references

External links
 21st Century Taiwanese Language & Art Web - website run by Prof. Liim Keahioong, EDUTECH Foundation, Tainan, Taiwan
 LearnTaiwanese.org
 Hydonsingore ee Hunhoarloo - a blog written in MLT
SMLT Homepage(簡式台語現代文) 

Languages of Taiwan
Romanization of Hokkien
Writing systems introduced in the 20th century
20th-century establishments in Taiwan